Maxsted is a surname. Notable people with the surname include:

Jack Maxsted (1916–2001), English art director
Lindsay Maxsted, Australian businessman